Jared Curtis (born 29 April 1979 in Apia, Samoa) is a Samoan former footballer. He was a Samoa international.

Manawatu United

Ascertained to trial for Manawatu United after representing his national team, Curtis was only part of the club for short time, making three appearances.

References

External links 
 at National-Football-Teams

Sportspeople from Apia
Living people
Samoan footballers
Expatriate association footballers in New Zealand
Samoan expatriate footballers
1979 births
Association football midfielders
Samoa international footballers
Wellington Olympic AFC players
Samoan expatriate sportspeople in New Zealand